"The Best Side of Life" is a song by German recording artist Sarah Connor. It was released by X-Cell Records as the lead single from the 2006 reissue of her first Christmas album, Christmas in My Heart (2005), accompanying the release of Connor's DVD of the same name. Written by Marc Lennard and Achim Heider under his pseudonym JoHo HF, the Christmas song was produced by frequent collaborators, duo Kay D. and Rob Tyger. A midtempo love song, the instrumentation includes bell chimes and harp sounds. The song's lyrics declare that the protagonist wants for Christmas to be united with her lover and family for the holidays.

The song replaced Melanie Thornton's "Wonderful Dream (Holidays are Coming)" in Coca-Cola's Christmas promotional campaign throughout German-speaking Europe. Commercially, "The Best Side of Life" peaked at number four on the German Singles Chart and reached the top twenty in Austria and Switzerland. It has since made several re-entries on the Media Control Charts, in December of the years 2007 to 2009, and of the years since 2017.

Music video
A music video for "The Best Side of Life" was directed by Oliver Sommer.

Track listing
All tracks produced by Kay Denar and Rob Tyger.

Notes
"Why Does It Rain" was inspired by the German christmas carol "Schneeflöckchen, Weißröckchen".

Charts

Weekly charts

Year-end charts

References

2000s ballads
2006 singles
Christmas songs
Pop ballads
Soul ballads
Sarah Connor (singer) songs
X-Cell Records singles
2005 songs